The Fiume Krone (abbreviated Cor. or FIUK) was introduced in the Free State of Fiume on 18 April 1919 by the National Council of Fiume who effectively exercised power in the City through stamping of the previous Austro-Hungarian Krone notes. After the Dannunzian occupation in September 1919, a new series of notes were stamped on behalf of the Istituto di credito del Consiglio Nazionale with a decree dated 6 October 1919. The Fiume Krone was the official currency of the City of Fiume up to 26 September 1920 when, by the decree of the general Amantea commander of the Italian troops in Fiume, the Italian lira was introduced as the new official currency.
The currency continued to circulate until the annexation of the city to Italy in February 1924. The royal decree n 235 of 24 February 1924 set the final conversion date on April 30, 1924, at 0.40 Italian lira for one Corona Fiumana.

Exchange rates

In November 1919, one Corona Fiumana was worth 3 Serb, Croat and Slovene Krone or 0.40 Italian lira. On the black market however, one Corona Fiumana sold for 0.21 lira.

References

External links

Modern obsolete currencies
Currencies of Europe
Currencies introduced in 1919
1920 disestablishments
Krone